Eduard Ludvik Pospichal (13 June 1838 – 24 April 1905) was an Austrian botanist of Czech parentage born in Litomyšl in Bohemia (today in the Czech Republic).

Pospichal was a teacher at a secondary school in Trieste. He was the author of Flora des Oesterreichischen Küstenlandes (1897–99), a comprehensive treatise on flora found in regions on and around the northeast Adriatic coast. Also, he was also the author a study of plants found along the banks of the Cidlina and Mrdlina Rivers in Bohemia, titled Flora des Flussgebietes der Cidlina und Mrdlina (1881).

References 
 Web ИРБИС64 (biographical information)
 Istria on the Internet- Flora & Fauna

1838 births
1905 deaths
People from Litomyšl
Czech botanists
19th-century Austrian botanists
Austrian people of Czech descent